The 2016–17 AS-Saint-Étienne season was the 84th professional season of the club since its creation in 1933.

Players

Squad information
Players and squad numbers last updated on 20 August 2016.Note: Flags indicate national team as has been defined under FIFA eligibility rules. Players may hold more than one non-FIFA nationality.

Transfers

In

Loans in

Out

Pre-season and friendlies

Competitions

Overall

Ligue 1

League table

Results summary

Results by round

Matches

Coupe de France

Coupe de la Ligue

UEFA Europa League

Third qualifying round

Play-off round

Group stage

Knockout phase

Round of 32

Statistics

Appearances and goals

|-
! colspan=14 style=background:#dcdcdc; text-align:center| Goalkeepers

|-
! colspan=14 style=background:#dcdcdc; text-align:center| Defenders

|-
! colspan=14 style=background:#dcdcdc; text-align:center| Midfielders

|-
! colspan=14 style=background:#dcdcdc; text-align:center| Forwards

|-
! colspan=14 style=background:#dcdcdc; text-align:center| Players transferred out during the season

Goalscorers
{| class="wikitable" style="text-align:center"
|-
!width=15|
!width=15|
!width=15|
!width=15|
!width=145|Name
!width=80|Ligue 1
!width=80|Coupe de France
!width=80|Coupe de la Ligue
!width=80|Europa League
!width=80|Total
|-
|1
| 27
| FW
| 
|align=left| Robert Berić
| 2
| 0
| 0
| 2
|4
|-
|2
| 21
| FW
| 
|align=left| Romain Hamouma
| 2
| 0
| 0
| 0
|2
|-
|rowspan=4|3
| 23
| FW
| 
|align=left| Alexander Søderlund
| 1
| 0
| 0
| 0
|1
|-
| 
| FW
| 
|align=left| Dylan Saint-Louis
| 1
| 0
| 0
| 0
|1
|-
| 22
| FW
| 
|align=left| Kévin Monnet-Paquet
| 1
| 0
| 0
| 0
|1
|-
| 18
| MF
| 
|align=left| Fabien Lemoine
| 0
| 0
| 0
| 1
|1
|-
|colspan=5|Own goal
|0
|0
|0
|1
|1
|-
|colspan=5|Totals
|6
|0
|0
|4
|10

Clean sheets

Last updated:

Disciplinary record

References

Saint-Etienne
AS Saint-Étienne seasons
Saint-Etienne